Sabalgarh Assembly constituency is one of the 230 Vidhan Sabha (Legislative Assembly) constituencies of Madhya Pradesh state in central India. This constituency came into existence in 1951, as one of the 79 Vidhan Sabha constituencies of the erstwhile Madhya Bharat state. Sabalgarh (constituency number 3) is one of the six Vidhan Sabha constituencies located in Morena district. This constituency covers the entire Sabalgarh tehsil and part of Kailaras tehsil.

Sabalgarh is part of Morena Lok Sabha constituency.

Members of Legislative Assembly
As a constituency of Madhya Bharat:
 1951: Laxmi Chand, Indian National Congress
As a constituency of Madhya Pradesh:
 1957: Baboolal, Indian National Congress / Balmukand, Indian National Congress
 1962: Buddha Ram, Independent
 1967: Brijraj Singh Sikarwar, Independent (IND)
 1972: Raghubar Dayal Rasoiya, Indian National Congress 
 1977: Sridharlal Hardenia, Janata Party
 1980: Suresh Chandra, Indian National Congress (I)
 1985: Bhagwati Prasad Bansal, Indian National Congress
 1990: Meharban Singh Rawat, Bharatiya Janata Party
 1993: Suresh Choudhari, Indian National Congress
 1998: Bundilal Rawat, Bahujan Samaj Party
 2003: Meharban Singh Rawat, Bharatiya Janata Party
 2008: Suresh Choudhari, Indian National Congress
 2013: Meharban Singh Rawat, Bharatiya Janata Party
2018: Baijnath Kushwaha, Indian National Congress

Election results

2018

See also
Sabalgarh

References

Morena district
Assembly constituencies of Madhya Pradesh